Hyder Seek is a long-distance motorcycle riding event (or motorcycle rally) held annually between 1998 and 2012.

The ride was established in 1998 when Iron Butt Association rider Ron Ayres set a 49-state record time by riding to Hyder at the end of a 48-state record ride. 
2010 was the last year the event was organized by Ron Ayres himself; 2011 and 2012 rallies were self-organized by attendees.

Notes

References

Annual events in Alaska
Cross-border races
Long-distance motorcycle riding
Motorcycle rallies in Canada
Motorcycle rallies in the United States
Motorsport in Alaska
Prince of Wales–Hyder Census Area, Alaska
Recurring sporting events disestablished in 2012
Recurring sporting events established in 1998